William Galley (2 March 1881 – 31 October 1941) was an English professional footballer who played in the Football League for Glossop as a left half.

Personal life 
Galley was married with two children and worked as a draper's assistant and buyer. Towards the end of the First World War, he enlisted as an Air Mechanic 3rd Class in the Royal Air Force and served with the Egyptian Expeditionary Force. Galley was discharged in April 1920. He was later employed as head of the furnishing department at Stretch & Harlock department store in Nantwich.

References

English footballers
English Football League players
Association football wing halves
Royal Air Force personnel of World War I
Nantwich Town F.C. players
Shrewsbury Town F.C. players
Glossop North End A.F.C. players
Chester City F.C. players
Crewe Alexandra F.C. players
Bolton Wanderers F.C. players

1881 births
People from Nantwich
1941 deaths